Cetuximab, sold under the brand name Erbitux, is an epidermal growth factor receptor (EGFR) inhibitor medication used for the treatment of metastatic colorectal cancer and head and neck cancer. Cetuximab is a chimeric (mouse/human) monoclonal antibody given by intravenous infusion.

In July 2009, the U.S. Food and Drug Administration (FDA) approved cetuximab (Erbitux) for treatment of colon cancer with wild-type KRAS, since it had little or no effect in colorectal tumors harboring a KRAS mutation (this also applied to the EGFR antibody panitumumab). This was the first genetic test to guide treatment of cancer. In July 2012, the FDA approved a real time PCR companion diagnostic test for KRAS, the therascreen KRAS test.

Medical uses 
In the US, cetuximab is indicated for treatment of head and neck cancer and colorectal cancer.

In the EU, cetuximab is indicated for the treatment of epidermal growth factor receptor (EGFR)-expressing, RAS wild-type metastatic colorectal cancer and for the treatment of squamous cell cancer of the head and neck.

A diagnostic immunohistochemistry assay (EGFR pharmDx) can be used to detect EGFR expression in the tumor material. Approximately 75% of patients with metastatic colorectal cancer have an EGFR-expressing tumor and are therefore considered eligible for treatment with cetuximab or panitumumab, according to FDA guidelines. Unfortunately, there is evidence that immunohistochemical EGFR receptor testing does not predict response to either cetuximab or panitumumab, so that this has been called a "misleading biomarker" that has nevertheless caused insurers and even health systems to deny payment for EGFR antibody treatment for patients who lack a positive tumor EGFR histochemical test.

Head and neck cancer 
Cetuximab was approved by the US Food and Drug Administration (FDA) in March 2006, for use in combination with radiation therapy for treating squamous cell carcinoma of the head and neck (SCCHN) or as a single agent in patients who have had prior platinum-based therapy.

Side effects 
One of the more serious side effects of cetuximab therapy is the incidence of acne-like rash. This rash rarely leads to dose reductions or termination of therapy. It is generally reversible.

Further severe infusion reactions include but are not limited to: fevers, chills, rigors, urticaria, itchiness, rash, hypotension, nausea, vomiting, headache, shortness of breath, wheezing, angioedema, dizziness, anaphylaxis, and cardiac arrest. Other common side effects include photosensitivity, hypomagnesemia due to magnesium wasting, and less commonly pulmonary and cardiac toxicity.

Alpha-gal allergy 
Certain geographic regions have a high rate of anaphylactic reactions to cetuximab upon the first exposure to the medication. This is unusual because exposure to the allergen must occur before the development of an allergy. Fewer than 1% of people in the northeast United States reacted, while greater than 20% in the southeast did.

Mechanism of action 
Cetuximab is a chimeric (mouse/human) monoclonal antibody which binds to and inhibits EGFR.

KRAS Testing 
The KRAS gene encodes a small G protein on the EGFR pathway. Cetuximab and other EGFR inhibitors only work on tumors in which KRAS is not mutated.

In July 2009, the US Food and Drug Administration (FDA) updated the labels of two anti-EGFR monoclonal antibody drugs (panitumumab (Vectibix) and cetuximab (Erbitux)) indicated for treatment of metastatic colorectal cancer to include information about KRAS mutations.

Studies have indicated that detection of KRAS gene mutations helps physicians identify patients that are unlikely to respond to treatment with targeted EGFR inhibitors, including cetuximab and panitumumab. Accordingly, genetic testing to confirm the absence of KRAS mutations (and so the presence of the KRAS wild-type gene), is now clinically routine before the start of treatment with EGFR inhibitors. mCRC patients with wild-type KRAS tumors have been shown to benefit from a response rate of over 60% and a decreased risk for progression of over 40% when treated with Erbitux as 1st-line therapy. Around 65% of mCRC patients have the KRAS wild-type gene.

There is some evidence that colorectal tumors with the KRAS G13D mutation (glycine to aspartate at codon 13) respond to EGFR inhibition (specifically, with Cetuximab). While the mechanism is still under investigation, current findings suggest that susceptibility to EGFR-inhibition  is due to how this particular variant maintains interactions with the GTPase activating protein (GAP) NFI.

History
Observations on EGFR inhibition were published in 1988. Yeda Research, on behalf of the Weizmann Institute of Science in Israel, challenged the Aventis-owned patent, licensed by Imclone, for the use of anti-epidermal growth factor receptor antibodies in combination with chemotherapy, to slow the growth of certain tumors which was filed in 1989 by Rhone-Poulenc-Rorer. The court ruled that Yeda is sole owner of the patent in the U.S., while Yeda and Sanofi-Aventis co-own the patent's foreign counterparts.

Society and culture

Manufacture
 Eli Lilly and Company is responsible for the manufacture and supply of Erbitux in bulk-form active pharmaceutical ingredient (API) for clinical and commercial use in the U.S. and Canada.
 Merck KGaA manufactures Erbitux for supply in its territory (outside the U.S. and Canada) as well as for Japan.

Distribution
 Erbitux is marketed in the U.S. and Canada by Eli Lilly.
 Outside the U.S. and Canada, Erbitux is commercialized by Merck KGaA. Eli Lilly receives royalties from Merck KGaA.
 A separate agreement grants co-exclusive rights among Merck, Bristol-Myers Squibb and Eli Lilly in Japan and expires in 2032.

Economics

Cetuximab is given by intravenous therapy and costs up to $30,000 for eight weeks of treatment per patient.

Merck KGaA had 887 million euros ($1.15 billion) in Erbitux sales in 2012, from head and neck as well as bowel cancer, while Bristol-Myers Squibb generated $702 million in sales from the drug.

Erbitux was the eighth best-selling cancer drug of 2013, with sales of $1.87 billion.

Biosimilars

Erbitux had 2013 worldwide sales of US$1.9 billion making it a lucrative target for biosimilars developers. Additionally the patent protection for Erbitux in Europe expired in June 2014, and in the U.S. and in Japan the protection will expire in 2016. However biosimilars of Erbitux are not expected until 2018.

As of 2014, biosimilars of cetuximab were in development by several companies.

Insider trading 

Cetuximab failed to get FDA approval in 2001, which caused the stock price of the developer ImClone to drop dramatically. Prior to the announcement, several executives sold stock, and the SEC launched an investigation into insider trading. This resulted in a widely publicized criminal case, which resulted in prison terms for media celebrity Martha Stewart, ImClone chief executive officer Samuel D. Waksal and Stewart's broker at Merrill Lynch, Peter Bacanovic.

Research
The efficacy of cetuximab was explored in a clinical trial of advanced gastric cancer published in 2013; cetuximab showed no survival benefit.

A 2020 phase III multicenter randomized controlled trial headed by University College London showed that adding cetuximab to perioperative chemotherapy worsened survival for colorectal cancer patients with operable liver metastases. With over 5 years of follow-up, median overall survival (OS) dropped from 81 months for patients treated with chemotherapy alone before and after liver resection, to 55.4 months for those that also received cetuximab.

A multicenter, single arm, phase II study is being conducted that is designed to evaluate the efficacy and safety of cetuximab for the treatment of advanced (unresectable)/metastatic, chordoma.

References

External links 
 
 

Monoclonal antibodies for tumors
Bristol Myers Squibb
Eli Lilly and Company brands
Merck brands